WBTH (1400 AM) is a radio station licensed to serve Williamson, West Virginia, United States. The station, established in 1939, is owned and operated by Lynn Parrish, through licensee Mountain Top Media LLC.

WBTH broadcasts a contemporary Christian format serving Williamson, Central Mingo County, West Virginia and Northeastern Pike County, Kentucky.

Call sign meaning
The call sign represents the first letters of the last name of the original owners of WBTH. Francis Wagner, William Booker, George Taylor, and William Hogg requested the WBTH call sign in 1939.

Previous logos

References

External links
Official Website

BTH
Radio stations established in 1939
1939 establishments in West Virginia
Mingo County, West Virginia